Mike Owusu (born 1 January 1977) is a Ghanaian-born Swedish former footballer who played as a defender.

Playing professionally in Sweden, the Netherlands, and Denmark, Owusu represented the Sweden U17, U19, and U21 teams internationally.

References

1977 births
Association football defenders
Ghanaian footballers
Swedish footballers
Swedish expatriate footballers
Allsvenskan players
Eredivisie players
Malmö FF players
Örgryte IS players
NEC Nijmegen players
Trelleborgs FF players
Expatriate footballers in the Netherlands
Expatriate men's footballers in Denmark
Living people